Maharlu Rural District is a rural district (dehestan) in Kuhenjan District, Sarvestan County, Fars Province, Iran. At the 2006 census, its population was 4,032, in 982 families.  The rural district has 5 villages.

References 

Rural Districts of Fars Province
Sarvestan County